The Lahore Stock Exchange was a financial facility located in Lahore, Pakistan. It was incorporated as a company Limited by Guarantee under the Companies Act 1913 on 5 October 1970. In the first General meeting of the Board of Directors held on the same day, it was decided that the Exchange will commence its working by December 1970. It was the third Exchange in the country after Karachi and Dacca. The 1st Registered office of Lahore Stock Exchange (G) Limited was located at 17-Bank Square, Lahore.

The purpose of establishing the Exchange was that the Province of Punjab with predominant middle class should have new avenues for investment and lay special emphasis on small and medium industries. The largest number of medium industries and business houses were located in Punjab; therefore many entrepreneurs with small industries in Punjab wished to build their industries broad based by converting them into public limited companies. Large agricultural wealth was also available to the people of the Punjab who constituted 62% of West Pakistan’s population and that wealth had to be geared for investment.
The institution was established to facilitate the investors of Punjab and Northern areas by providing them an access to the Capital Market and enable them to take part in the progress of the Corporate Sector of the country. Ever since, the institution has served the cause of investing in small and large numbers, also providing the services and market place not only in Lahore but also beyond the city’s boundaries.

History
The Lahore Stock Exchange was established in October 1970, under the Securities and Exchange Ordinance, 1969 by the Government of Pakistan in response to the needs for the provincial capital of Punjab. It initially had 83 companies listed and was headquartered at Bank Square in Lahore. The number of listed companies increased to 519 since its inception. The Lahore Stock Exchange opened branches in the industrial cities of Faisalabad and Sialkot for trading. The Sialkot branch is referred to as the Sialkot Trading Floor. With effect from 11 January 2016, the Lahore Stock Exchange was integrated with the Karachi Stock Exchange and Islamabad Stock Exchange under the Stock Exchanges (Corporatisation, Demutualization and Integration) Act, 2012 to form the Pakistan Stock Exchange.

LSE-25
LSE-25: The Lahore Stock Exchange Twenty Five company index calculates the performance of stocks assuming that all rights issues and bonus share issues only increase the listed capital so that the prices of the shares are not adjusted as they are in the case of the LSETRI. The LSE25 also assumes that dividends paid out by a component company are not reinvested. In summary, in the LSE25, no price adjustments are made when any component company issues cash dividends.

LSETRI
The Lahore Stock Exchange Total Return Index calculates the performance of stocks assuming that all payouts are reinvested in the index on the ex-date. The LSETRI assumes that if a component company issues bonus shares or announces a rights issue it will increase the listed capital. Additionally, the LSETRI also assumes that all pay-outs by a component company are 100% reinvested in the index. Therefore, the LSETRI is adjusted against such payouts announced by any of index constituents on its ex-date allowing the index value to remain comparable over time.

See also
 List of South Asian stock exchanges

References

External links

Former stock exchanges in Pakistan
Economy of Lahore
Pakistan Stock Exchange
Pakistani companies established in 1970
Financial services companies established in 1970